The 1903 Washington University football team represented the Washington University in St. Louis as an independent during the 1903 college football season. Led by first-year head coach L. W. Boynton, Washington University compiled a 4–4–2 record and outscored their opponents by a total of 109 to 103.

Schedule

References

Washington University
Washington University Bears football seasons
Washington University football